13 Annis Street is a historic mill worker house in Methuen, Massachusetts. Built about 1880, it is a typical small residence built for workers at the nearby Arlington Mills. It was added to the National Register of Historic Places in 1984, but has lost many of its exterior decorative details since.

Description and history
The house stands in a dense residential area of southern Methuen, on the north side of Annis Street between Tenney Street and Broadway (Massachusetts Route 28). It is a -story wood-frame structure, with a gabled roof, two brick chimneys, and exterior clad in synthetic siding. Its front facade is two bays wide, with the entrance on the right, under a hood supported by a simple knee bracket. The left bay has a projecting polygonal bay, and there are two windows in the attic level above. When surveyed in the 1980s, the house had a somewhat more elaborate exterior: the roof had extended eaves with Italianate brackets, and the attic windows had Italianate bracketed surrounds with diamond-shaped keystones. The main entry hood featured Italianate brackets, and similar window detailing was found on the windows of the bay.

Annis was one of the first streets to experience residential development due to the expansion of the Arlington Mills. It lies in what is now the Arlington Mills Historic District, the area immediately to the west along Stevens Pond of the Spicket River. The mills employed thousands of workers who lived in Lawrence and Methuen, but owned little worker housing. This building is representative of the inexpensive dwellings built by speculators for sale to woolen mill workers, which are commonly found in the immediate area. Its historical integrity has been damaged by the removal of many of its exterior decorative features.

See also
 National Register of Historic Places listings in Methuen, Massachusetts
 National Register of Historic Places listings in Essex County, Massachusetts

References

Houses in Methuen, Massachusetts
National Register of Historic Places in Methuen, Massachusetts
Houses on the National Register of Historic Places in Essex County, Massachusetts
Italianate architecture in Massachusetts